"The King Is Gone (So Are You)", originally titled "Ya Ba Da Ba Do (So Are You)", is a song written by Roger D. Ferris, and recorded by American country music singer George Jones. It was released in April 1989 as the second single from the album One Woman Man. Eventually the song was covered by The Highwaymen on their album "The Very Best of the Highwaymen"

Content
The song is about a man who uses the occasion of a breakup to open a bottle of Jim Beam which is shaped like Elvis Presley, the head of the deceased singer forming the bottle top. He further prepares for an evening of drinking by soaking the label off a Welch's jelly jar which has The Flintstones character Fred Flintstone, in order to better use it as a glass. Filling the label-less jar up to "Fred's pelvis"—the middle of the jar—he drinks so much that, at 10:00pm, he begins to talk with each character (Fred and Elvis), regarding them both as his drinking buddies. The song continues by saying that the conversation eventually turns to women, with Elvis advising to, "find 'em young" and Fred saying, "Ol' fashioned girls are fun." This first phrase is an allusion to Presley's having started a relationship with his wife, Priscilla Anne Wagner, when she was 14 years old. The second phrase is a reference to Fred Flintstone being a cartoon caveman. 

It became a live favorite for Jones and was included on the 1994 Sony box set The Essential George Jones: The Spirit of Country.

Release history
Initially, the composition had been titled "Ya Ba Da Ba Do (So Are You)" but the song's publisher altered the title per the request of Hanna-Barbera, creators and owners of The Flintstones. Shortly after Columbia Records issued the single, they also re-issued the single with the original title covered up with a sticker and insisted that disc jockeys refer to the song by the altered title instead. Columbia Records also issued a press release indicating that Hanna-Barbera did not endorse the single.

Chart performance
"The King Is Gone (So Are You)" charted on Hot Country Songs for 13 weeks starting in April 1989, peaking at number 26.

References

1989 singles
Epic Records singles
Song recordings produced by Billy Sherrill
George Jones songs
Songs about Elvis Presley
The Flintstones
Songs about fictional characters